At the Edge of Conquest: The Journey of Chief Wai-Wai is a 1992 American-Canadian short documentary film directed by Geoffrey O'Connor. It was nominated for an Academy Award for Best Documentary Short at the 65th Academy Awards.

References

External links
At the Edge of Conquest: The Journey of Chief Wai-Wai at Filmmakers Library Online

1992 films
1992 documentary films
1992 short films
American short documentary films
American independent films
Canadian short documentary films
Anthropology documentary films
Indigenous topics of the Guianas
1992 independent films
1990s short documentary films
1990s English-language films
1990s American films
1990s Canadian films